Gertrude Katherine Lathrop (1896–1986) was an American sculptor known for her medallion work and sculptures of small animals.

Biography

Early life and education 
Lathrop was born in Albany, New York to artist Ida Pulis Lathrop and Cyrus Clark Lathrop. Her sister Dorothy P. Lathrop was an artist too.

She studied at Art Students League in 1918 with Gutzon Borglum and at the School of American Sculpture, also with Borglum.

Career 
Her first exhibition was in the National Academy of Design in 1921. In 1924, she went to Gloucester, Massachusetts to study with Charles Grafly.

She was awarded a Honorable Mention from the Art Institute of Chicago, in 1924, as well as the Helen Foster Barnett prize and the National Academy of Design, both in 1928.

She was engaged by Westchester County Coin Club of New Rochelle, New York, to design the 1938 New Rochelle Half Dollar, in 1938.

She was awarded the Allied Artists of America's Medal of Honor in 1964. Three years later, in 1967, she was awarded the Pen and Brush Club's Silver Medal. In 1970, she won the John Sanford Saltus Gold Medal from the British Numismatic Society.

She was an accomplished medalist and modeled for portraits, but her main passion was sculpting animals. She said of it, "I chose to model animals because of their infinite variety of form and texture and their great beauty, for even the lowliest of them have beauty, yes even the ward bug, with his magnificent tusks."

In 1954, she moved with her sister, who was a noted illustrator of children's books, to Falls Village, Connecticut, where she would live for the rest of her life.

Collections 

Her work is included in the collections of the Seattle Art Museum, the Smithsonian American Art Museum, the National Gallery of Art, Washington, the Albany Institute of History & Art and the Metropolitan Museum of Art.

She designed the New Rochelle 250th Anniversary half dollar and the Albany Charter half dollar.

She died in Falls Village, Connecticut in 1986.

References

1896 births
1986 deaths
20th-century American women artists
Artists in the Smithsonian American Art Museum collection